Robert Smith (fl. 1545) was an English politician.

He was a Member (MP) of the Parliament of England for Carlisle in 1545.

References

Year of birth missing
Year of death missing
English MPs 1545–1547
Politics of Carlisle, Cumbria